The Who by Numbers Tour was a concert tour by the English rock band the Who, in support of their seventh album, The Who by Numbers (1975). It began on 3 October 1975, ended on 21 October 1976 and consisted of 79 concerts split between North America and Europe. Despite being named after The Who by Numbers, few songs from the album were actually performed during the tour.

The tour began with a European leg, which introduced the band's first use of a laser lighting display, and was followed by a North American leg that set indoor concert attendance records. The Who returned to America again in 1976 after playing several more shows in Europe, including three back-to-back Christmas shows at the Hammersmith Odeon, London. The opening 1976 US show in Boston came to an end when drummer Keith Moon collapsed on stage after playing only two songs. The following day he seriously injured himself and nearly bled to death. After performing at British football stadiums in May and June of 1976, the Who returned again to North America for the final of leg of concerts. Following their show in Miami, Moon was hospitalised for over a week. His erratic behavior worried the other band members who believed he would not be able to finish the tour. Moon did manage to complete the tour, however, the final shows became his last public concerts before dying of a drug overdose in 1978.

Background 
The Who by Numbers Tour started with 20 European dates in October and November 1975. The first concert took place at Bingley Hall in Stafford, England on 3 October 1975, the same day The Who by Numbers album was released. Prior to this, the Who had not performed live since playing four shows at Madison Square Garden in New York City the previous June, having spent much of 1974 working on the film adaptation of their rock opera Tommy and its soundtrack. A laser lighting display was introduced at the concerts at Leicester's Granby Halls shortly into the European leg, which would become a fixture of most of the tour's shows.

The tour continued with a North American leg in November and December 1975, starting on 20 November at The Summit in Houston, Texas. In North America, the band broke indoor concert attendance records for their 6 December concert at the Pontiac Metropolitan Stadium in Pontiac, Michigan, which attracted over 75,000 fans. Following the end of the North American leg, the band returned to the UK to play three Christmas concerts at the Hammersmith Odeon, London, due to high ticket demand for the earlier British dates.

Following four European dates in early 1976, the Who began a series of shows in the United States on 9 March at the Boston Garden. The tour had a disastrous start when Moon collapsed on stage just two songs into the Boston concert, causing the show to be postponed until 1 April. The day after the aborted concert, Moon kicked the glass out of a framed painting in his hotel room and seriously injured his heel in the process. He was discovered by manager Bill Curbishley, who took him to a hospital. Doctors told Curbishley that if he had not intervened, Moon would have bled to death. In his book Before I Get Old: The Story of the Who, music critic Dave Marsh suggested that at this point the Who's singer Roger Daltrey and bassist John Entwistle seriously considered firing Moon, but decided that doing so would make his life worse. The rest of the trip went without incident. In recognition of the band's performance at the Dane County Coliseum in Madison, Wisconsin, mayor Paul Soglin proclaimed 13 March 1976 "Who-Mania Day", the day of the concert. The band played the leg's only outdoor show on 21 March 1976 at Anaheim Stadium in Anaheim, California.

The band continued The Who by Numbers Tour with "The Who Put the Boot In", a series of concerts in French arenas and British football stadiums, featuring a 60,000 capacity concert at The Valley in London. The show, which took place on 31 May 1976, was recognised by The Guinness Book of Records as the world's loudest concert, with the sound measuring 120 decibels. The band returned to the US in August to play four shows as a part of the "Whirlwind" leg. The leg was marred by a show in Jacksonville, Florida, which was 25,000 tickets short of a sellout. At the end of the "Whirlwind" tour in Miami, Moon was again hospitalised for eight days. Although the group were concerned that he would be unable to complete the last leg of the tour, which consisted of nine dates in the US and Canada throughout October 1976, Moon successfully played the shows, performing for the final time in public at Maple Leaf Gardens in Toronto on 21 October. Moon died less than two years later, on 7 September 1978. Bassist John Entwistle would go on to say that Moon and the Who reached their live performance peak during the tour.

Reception 
The tour was well received by critics. Billboard's Gerry Wood gave the band's 20 November 1975 show a very positive review, writing that "they were tight from the start and gave an energetic performance of their new songs and an amazingly fresh treatment to their older material." Jim Melanson, also from Billboard, lauded their concert on 11 March 1976 calling it "superb." Jim Healey of The Des Moines Register praised the band's performance on 2 December 1975, describing it as a show with class. Writing for The Plain Dealer, Jane Scott said in her write-up of the show on 9 December 1975 was "the most exhilarating and dramatic concert seen in this area." Derek Jewell was less favorable in his review for The Sunday Times, noting the lack of new songs the band performed and writing that "the Who are trapped playing ageing music for the ageing young."

Set list 
The Who's lineup during this tour consisted of Roger Daltrey (lead vocals, harmonica, tambourine), Pete Townshend (guitar, vocals), John Entwistle (bass guitar, vocals), and Keith Moon (drums, percussion, vocals). Biographers Andrew Neill and Matt Kent wrote in their book Anyway Anyhow Anywhere: The Complete Chronicle of The Who 1958–1978 that the tour had become a "greatest hits" celebration of the band's decade-long career by 1976. Despite ostensibly being a tour supporting the release of The Who by Numbers, few songs from the new album were performed live. Instead, the band opted to perform a mini-set of Tommy material in the middle of the set, thanks to the success of the film generating more interest in the rock opera. Meanwhile, less and less Quadrophenia material was performed compared to the Who's previous tour, with only "Drowned" occasionally finding its way into the set during early dates, before eventually being dropped.

Authors Joe McMichael and "Irish" Jack Lyons considers the following songs representative of the tour's set list. All songs written by Pete Townshend unless otherwise specified.

 "I Can't Explain"
 "Substitute"
 "My Wife" (John Entwistle)
 "Baba O'Riley"
 "Squeeze Box"
 "Behind Blue Eyes"
 "Dreaming from the Waist"
 "Boris the Spider" (Entwistle)
 "Magic Bus"
 "Amazing Journey"
 "Sparks"
 "The Acid Queen"
 "Fiddle About" (Entwistle)
 "Pinball Wizard"
 "I'm Free"
 "Tommy's Holiday Camp"
 "We're Not Gonna Take It"
 "See Me, Feel Me"
 "Summertime Blues" (Eddie Cochran, Jerry Capehart)
 "My Generation"
 "Join Together"
 "My Generation Blues"
 "Road Runner" (Ellas McDaniel)
 "Won't Get Fooled Again"

Films and albums 
Over the years, one film has been released of the band's concert performances during The Who by Numbers Tour.

 The Who: Live in Texas '75 (Houston, 20 November 1975, released 2012)

Additionally, songs recorded during the tour have been released along with other live and/or studio material:

 The Kids Are Alright (soundtrack, 1979): "Join Together", "Road Runner", "My Generation Blues" (Pontiac, 6 December 1975)
 The Kids Are Alright (film, 1979): "Join Together", "Road Runner", "My Generation Blues" (Pontiac, 6 December 1975)
 Thirty Years of Maximum R&B (1994): "Dreaming from the Waist", "My Wife" (Swansea, 12 June 1976)
 Thirty Years of Maximum R&B Live (1994): "Dreaming from the Waist" (Richfield, 9 December 1975)
 The Who by Numbers (reissue 1996): "Squeeze Box", "Behind Blue Eyes", "Dreaming from the Waist" (Swansea, 12 June 1976)
 View from a Backstage Pass (2007): "Squeeze Box", "Dreaming from the Waist", "Fiddle About", "Pinball Wizard", "I'm Free", "Tommy's Holiday Camp", "We're Not Gonna Take It", "See Me, Feel Me" (Swansea, 12 June 1976)
 Greatest Hits Live (2010): "Pinball Wizard", "I'm Free", "Squeeze Box" (Swansea, 12 June 1976)
 Tommy (reissue 2013): "I'm Free", "Tommy's Holiday Camp", "We're Not Gonna Take It", "See Me, Feel Me" (Swansea, 12 June 1976)

Tour dates

See also
 List of The Who tours and performances

Notes

Footnotes

References

External links 
 The Who Past Shows 1975 at the Who's official website
 The Who Past Shows 1976 at the Who's official website

1975 concert tours
1976 concert tours
The Who concert tours
Concert tours of Europe
Concert tours of North America